Edgar Honetschläger is an Austrian artist, filmmaker, environmental activist and is the co-creator of Chickens Suit, a clothing range for chickens.

Personal life
Edgar Honetschläger, born in Austria, spent four years in the US, twelve years in Japan, three years in Italy and one in Brazil. 1997 he participated in Documenta X, 1998 he presented his first feature film MILK at the Berlinale. His photos, drawings, paintings, videos and installations where shown at Mudam Luxemburg, National Palace Museum Taiwan, Kunsthallen Brandts Odense Denmark, Triennale Milano, Kunsthalle Vienna, Hammer Museum Los Angeles, Art Basel or Sagatcho Exhibit Space Tokyo among others. His works are to be found in public and private collections, for example at Minato Mirai Yokohama Japan, the Museum of Modern Art Luxemburg, the Albertina Vienna, IBM, the Museum of Modern Art Salzburg, Bank Austria Vienna, in the Artothek - Collection of the government of Austria, the T-Mobile Collection and Red Bull Salzburg Austria. The artist and filmmaker currently lives in Italy and Vienna.

Works

NPO
GOBUGSGO (2018)

Films
FLUKUTHUK (2018), 13min.
LOS FELIZ (2016), 105 min.
320 FILOSOFIANA (2015), 18min.
OMSCH (2013), 83min. 
KAZUE (2012), 2min. 
LONGING (2012), 3min. 
AUN (2011), 100min. 
SUGAR AND ICE (2008), 6min. 
BEIJING HOLIDAY (2007), 13min. 
THE AUDIENCE (2006) 
ERNI (2005), 7min. 
IL MARE E LA TORTA (2003), 60min. 
GEORGE IN HOLLYWOOD (2002), 3min. 
ENDURING FREEDOM (2002), 4min.
LOS FELIZ (2001)
ISOLA FARNES (2001)
L + R (2000), 79min. 
COLORS = the history of chocolate, masaccio, in times of emergency (2000), 33min.
MILK (1997), 100min. 
97-(13+1) (1996), 10min. 
HCN MIAU (1995)
GADGETS (1994), 12min. 
SEQUENCES (1991), 15min.

Group and Solo Shows

1990 Palais Wittgenstein, Vienna
1991 MJS Books and Graphics, New York
1992 Kunst Raum Stuttgart; Austrian Cultural Institute New York; Asacloth Gallery, Tokyo
1993 Gallery Hosomi, Tokyo; SAI Gallery, Osaka
1994 Sagacho Exhibit Space Tokyo
1995 Art Fair Yokohama; Philips Galerie, Vienna
1997 documenta X; Griffin Contemporary Exhibitions, Los Angeles; Art Basel
1999 Artforum Meran; Kunstraum Viktor Bucher, Vienna
2000 Kunsthalle Wien, Kunsthalle Krems, FIAC Paris
2001 Landesgalerie am Oberösterreichischen Landesmuseum, Linz; Steirischen Herbst, Graz; Triennale Milano
2002 Kunsthallen Brandts, Odense; Art Cologne
2004 Galerie Charim, Vienna; Vienna Art Fair; Art Zürich
2005 World Expo Aichi, Japan; Hangar 7, Salzburg
2006 Aarhus Kunstbygning – Center for Contemporary Art
2007 Taiwan National Palace Museum, Taipei; Ursula Blickle Stiftung
2008 Wien Museum; Fotohof Salzburg; Nationalbibliothek, Vienna
2009 Lentos Linz; Kunsthalle Krems
2010 MUDAM Luxembourg; Casino Luxembourg
2011 Charim Galerie, Vienna; Oberösterreichische Landesgalerie; Rupertinum Salzburg
2012 Bambin Art Gallery, Tokyo
2013 Kunstforum Montafon; Museum Kunst der Westkünste, Germany; Belvedere 21, Vienna; TBA 21, Wien; Steinbrener/Dempf, Vienna
2014 Vienna Art Week; Traklhaus Salzburg; Vienna Parkfair
2016 Belvedere 21, Wien; Museo d'Arte Contemporanea di Roma
2018 Kunsthalle Wien; Charim Galerie, Vienna
2019 Forum Stadtpark Graz; Oberösterreichische Landesgalerie; Museum der Moderne Salzburg

Books and Catalogues
2017 EIN KAPPA GEHT NACH TOKYO, Schlebrügge.Editor, text: Edgar Honetschläger 
2015 SUGAR and ICE, a book about Brasilia, Schlebrügge. Editor 
2009 EDOPOLIS, Krems/Luxembourg, Dieter Buchhart+Enrico Lunghi 
2008 TOKYO PLAIN, Fotohof Salzburg, text: Edgar Honetschläger 
2001 REGIE/DIRECTING, Linz/Odense, Martin Hochleitner, Georg Seeßlen, Thorsten Sadowsky 
2000 I HAVE TIME, Jan Tabor 
1997 97-(13+1), DOCUMENTA X, Edgar Honetschläger 
1994 SCHUHWERK, Masami Shiraishi, Kazuko Koike, Fumio Nanjo 
1992 TOOLS,Galerie Asacloth Tokyo + Galerie im Stifter Haus Linz. Junji Ito, Peter Assmann 
1990 WITTGENSTEIN, with Elisabeth Plank, introduction Oswald Oberhuber, Herbert Lachmayr

Chickens Suit

Described by Honetschläger as "something that you don't really need but everyone wants to have anyway", Chickens Suit was released in 2005 with the help of Wilhlem Mahringer. The suits debuted at the Expo 2005 and have toured Paris, Tokyo and Vienna. The suits also come in a variety of styles.

References

External links
Official website
Official Chickens Suit website
A videoportrait of Edgar Honetschläger by CastYourArt Vienna, CastYourArt, 2010

Austrian artists
Austrian film directors
Living people
Year of birth missing (living people)